Syed Ahmad Saeed Kirmani was a Pakistani politician and lawyer who the West Pakistan Minister for Finance, Information, Excise, Taxation, and Railways between 1966 and 1969.

He was a member of the Punjab Legislative Assembly between 1951 and 1955 and the West Pakistan Assembly between 1956 and 1958 and again from 1962 to 1966. He also served as ambassador of Pakistan to Egypt and North Yemen from 1974 to 1977

His son, Asif Kirmani, is a member of the Senate of Pakistan.

References

2018 deaths
Punjab, Pakistan MLAs 1951–1955
20th-century Pakistani lawyers
Pakistan Muslim League (N) politicians